Thomas A. Lemoine House may refer to:

Thomas A. Lemoine House (Hamburg, Louisiana), listed on the National Register of Historic Places in Avoyelles Parish, Louisiana
Thomas A. Lemoine House (Moreauville, Louisiana), listed on the National Register of Historic Places in Avoyelles Parish, Louisiana